Live/Backstage at the Coffee Gallery (stylized as Live/Backstage @ the Coffee Gallery) is a live performance album collaboration between guitarists Peter Tork and James Lee Stanley released in 2006 by Beachwood Recordings. It was Tork's fifth album without The Monkees and the third and final collaboration with Stanley.

The concert was recorded live at The Coffee Gallery in Altadena, California, during the duo's final tour together.

Track listing

Personnel 
Peter Tork – vocals, acoustic guitar, electric guitar, banjo
James Lee Stanley – vocals, acoustic guitar, electric guitar, producer
Bob Stane – producer
Dean Acheson – producer

References

2006 albums
Peter Tork albums